The R744 road is a regional road in County Wexford, Ireland. It travels from the N30 road west of Enniscorthy,  via Enniscorthy to Blackwater.

References

Regional roads in the Republic of Ireland
Roads in County Wexford